It's a Big Daddy Thing is the second full-length album by American rapper Big Daddy Kane. It was released on September 19, 1989 by Cold Chillin' Records and Warner Bros. Records. Critics call it his best album by far.

Background
Unlike his debut album, which was solely produced by Marley Marl, Kane himself produced the majority of the album. Production was also provided by Prince Paul, Easy Mo Bee, Teddy Riley, Mister Cee, as well as Marley Marl. In character with his first album and many other albums of the day, It's a Big Daddy Thing branches out into different styles, from battle rhymes to love ballads and more. His later posturing as a self-proclaimed ladies' man is somewhat foreshadowed by the hit song "Smooth Operator". 

Even though "Wrath of Kane" had already been recorded & released on the "I'll Take You There" single, a decision was made to include a live performance taken from the Apollo Theater. The studio version has never been released on compact disc.

To date, it is his most successful effort commercially, certified gold by RIAA.

Legacy
In 1998, the album was selected as one of The Source's 100 Best Rap Albums.

In 2004, the song, "Warm it Up, Kane" appeared at classic hip hop radio station Playback FM, in the popular video game Grand Theft Auto: San Andreas.

In 2008, the single "I Get The Job Done" was ranked number 57 on VH1's 100 Greatest Songs of Hip Hop.

The track It's a Big Daddy Thing has sampled sound bit from ITC Entertainment ident.

Track listing 

Tracks 8 and 17 are omitted from the vinyl version.

Charts

Weekly charts

Year-end charts

Singles

Certifications

References

Big Daddy Kane albums
1989 albums
Albums produced by Marley Marl
Albums produced by Big Daddy Kane
Albums produced by Prince Paul (producer)
Albums produced by Teddy Riley
Albums produced by Easy Mo Bee
Cold Chillin' Records albums